In enzymology, a bis(5'-adenosyl)-triphosphatase is an enzyme that catalyzes the chemical reaction

P1,P3-bis(5'-adenosyl) triphosphate + H2O  ADP + AMP

Thus, the two substrates of this enzyme are P1,P3-bis(5'-adenosyl) triphosphate and H2O, whereas its two products are ADP and AMP.

This enzyme belongs to the family of hydrolases, specifically those acting on acid anhydrides in phosphorus-containing anhydrides.  The systematic name of this enzyme class is P1,P3-bis(5'-adenosyl)-triphosphate adenylohydrolase. Other names in common use include dinucleosidetriphosphatase, diadenosine 5,5-P1,P3-triphosphatase, and 1-P,3-P-bis(5'-adenosyl)-triphosphate adenylohydrolase.  This enzyme participates metabolic pathways involved in purine metabolism, and may have a role in the development of small cell lung cancer, and non-small cell lung cancer.

Structural studies

References

 
 

EC 3.6.1
Enzymes of known structure